The Long Wavelength Array (LWA) is a radio telescope in central New Mexico. It began preliminary tests of the hardware in 2011, and began regular operations in late 2015.  It is one of the few observatories to utilize relatively low frequencies (10-88 MHz), and is used to study relativistic particles, cosmic evolution, astrophysical plasma, decametric radio emissions from Jupiter-like extrasolar planets, and giant flares from magnetars.

 it consisted of a single station with 256 antennas. The first station, located adjacent to the NRAO's VLA, consists of 256 antennas and was completed in December 2009. It was dedicated in April 2010, and routine operations began in 2011.

The project is a collaboration of UNM, VT, LANL, JPL, NRL, UI, BIRS, NRAO and AFRL.

See also 
 Australian Square Kilometre Array Pathfinder 
 List of astronomical observatories
 LOFAR
 MeerKAT
 Murchison Widefield Array
 Square Kilometre Array

References 

Radio telescopes
Astronomical observatories in New Mexico
Interferometric telescopes
Buildings and structures in Socorro County, New Mexico
2011 establishments in New Mexico